El Koshary Today is an Egyptian online news website that features satire and political parody. The website is named for a common Egyptian dish consisting of a spaghetti mixture that may also contain lentils, rice, and chickpeas. According to Zohny, "Koshary is sort of a very reflective meal of the country in the sense that it's a very chaotic kind of meal".

Beginnings 
The website began in 2008 when three friends got together to start a newspaper similar to America's The Onion, but with a specific philosophy. When a newsprint edition didn't work out, they decided to publish online.  Initially they wrote anonymously under the pen names Makarona (macaroni), Ward Zeyada (extra onions) and Subar Lox (large-sized Koshary).
   
News items are not added on any schedule, but as inspiration strikes.  Past topics have included the 2011 revolution as well as the 2012 elections.

Regular features 
The El Koshary Today portal has the appearance of a mainstream news site.  Sections are categorized in the same manner as news websites: Features, International, Opinions, Arts, Science-Fiction and Technology, Sports, and Mind and Soul, and even Classified ads and "Horrorscopes."

Fake headlines mock the news by putting a twist on actual government messages.  One such mock headline quoted the government as saying, "Complaining to strangers may lead to annihilation,"  a play on government ads warning Egyptians not to talk with foreigners.

Impact 
The website's philosophy is to use satire and imagination to raise awareness of national issues in a way that is humorous, but also invites action. Websites such as El Koshary Today and others have been credited with part of a larger global trend towards the use of social media and humor to create political change that reached a much broader public during the 2011 Egyptian revolution in Cairo’s Tahrir Square.

See also
 List of satirical magazines
 List of satirical news websites
 List of satirical television news programs

References

External links 
elkoshary.com (Official website)
facebook.com/elkoshary (Facebook)
twitter.com/elkoshary (Twitter)
"Egypt’s 'most reliable news source'". PRI's The World, June 17, 2010. Retrieved 9/8/2012.
"A Dish Called Koshary", PRI's The World, August 25, 2011. Retrieved 9/8/2012.

Satirical websites
Egyptian news websites